The Best of Joan C. Baez is a Joan Baez compilation that A&M put together shortly after Baez left the label in 1977. Selections from five of her six A&M albums were included (no songs from 1973's Where Are You Now, My Son? appear), with the emphasis on material from 1975's Diamonds & Rust album.  Liner notes were written by John L. Wasserman of the San Francisco Chronicle.

Track listing
All tracks composed by Joan Baez; except where indicated

"Diamonds & Rust"
"Forever Young" (Bob Dylan)
"Prison Trilogy (Billy Rose)"
"Simple Twist of Fate" (Bob Dylan)
"Never Dreamed You'd Leave in Summer" (Stevie Wonder, Syreeta Wright)
"Love Song to a Stranger"
"Please Come to Boston" (Dave Loggins)
"Children and All That Jazz"
"Sweeter for Me"
"Imagine" (John Lennon)
"Gracias a la Vida" (Violeta Parra)
"The Night They Drove Old Dixie Down" (Robbie Robertson)

Charts

References 

1977 greatest hits albums
Joan Baez compilation albums
A&M Records compilation albums
Albums produced by David Kershenbaum